Let Sleeping Cops Lie also known as Don't Wake a Sleeping Cop (French: Ne réveillez pas un flic qui dort) is a French crime film released in 1988, directed by José Pinheiro, starring Alain Delon and Michel Serrault. The screenplay is written by Alain Delon and José Pinheiro based on the novel Clause de style by Frédéric H. Fajardie.

The movie tells the story of police inspector Eugéne Grindel (Delon) who investigates the secret illegal ultra-right police organization which mete out justice on a fast track.

Let Sleeping Cops Lie is the last film of a group of popular movies released in the 1980s and starring Alain Delon, which share a visual and narrative style, beginning with Jacques Deray's Three Men to Kill (1980). It was the least successfully commercially.

Alain Delon, also being the film’s producer, dedicated the work to the memory of actor Jean Gabin.

Plot
Roger Scatti (Serrault) is a conservative police inspector of the old school. He finds intolerable the liberalization of the justice system. More and more people from the underground world slip away from the justice. Finding allies in the police circles, he founded the ultra-right secret illegal organization called "Police devotion". Its purpose is the immediate punishment, usually death, of the notorious criminals, with no trials or whatever inquiries and no bureaucracy. The activities of the organization are particularly brutal, serving for edification to the public. When the punitive operations of the "Police devotion" go out of all bounds, the police chief Cazalières (Gérôme) assign a task to inspector Eugéne Grindel (Delon) to investigate the present circumstances.

Cast
Alain Delon as a police inspector Eugéne Grindel
Michel Serrault as a police inspector Roger Scatti
Xavier Deluc as Lutz
Patrick Catalifo as Pèret, Grindel's assistant
Raymond Gérôme as a chief inspector Cazalières
Serge Reggiani as Le Stéphanois
Bernard Farcy as Inspector Latueva
Féodor Atkine as Stadler
Roxan Gould as Jennifer
Stéphane Jobert as Spiero
Consuelo De Haviland as Corinne
Dominique Valera as Valles
Bruno Raffaelli as Zelleim
Guy Cuevas as Bessoni
Rémy Kirch as Ginzbaum
Olivier Marchal as Ginzbaum's friend
Philippe Nahon as Sergeant #2
Laurent Gamelon as The Baby's Man

References

External links
 

1988 films
1980s crime thriller films
Films produced by Alain Delon
French crime thriller films
Films directed by José Pinheiro
1980s French films